Babett Szalai (born 21 February 1990) is a Hungarian handballer for Dunaújvárosi KKA and the Hungarian national team.

Szalai previously played for Győri ETO KC, Debreceni VSC and Siófok KC.

She made her international debut on 1 December 2018 against Netherlands.

References

1990 births
Living people
Hungarian female handball players
Győri Audi ETO KC players
Siófok KC players
People from Körmend
Sportspeople from Vas County